Truman Layton "T. L." Plain was an American basketball coach. Plain graduated from Western Kentucky State Teachers College in 1950, and received his master's degree from Murray State. Plain coached various high school basketball and baseball teams in Western Kentucky and Southern Indiana in the 1950s and 1960s From 1959 to 1963 T.L. Plain was the coach of the Kentucky Wesleyan Panthers where he coached the team to two NCAA Division II Tournaments. After two years of assistant coaching at University of Louisville Plain became an assistant coach for the University of Kentucky under coach Adolph Rupp. While at Kentucky, he was a part of the 1970 NCAA Runner up team. When Rupp was forced to retire by state law, the choice was down to Joe B. Hall and Plain for the head coaching position. T. L. Plain get the chance at a Division I school with Utah State University. His post coaching career included coordinator of convention sales at the Executive Inn in Evansville, Indiana. Since 2005 he has resided in Owensboro, Kentucky

Head coaching record

College

References

1925 births
2020 deaths
American men's basketball coaches
High school basketball coaches in the United States
Kentucky Wesleyan Panthers men's basketball coaches
Kentucky Wildcats men's basketball coaches
Louisville Cardinals men's basketball coaches
Utah State Aggies men's basketball coaches
Western Kentucky University alumni
People from McLean County, Kentucky